The foundry model is a microelectronics engineering and manufacturing business model consisting of a semiconductor fabrication plant, or foundry, and an integrated circuit design operation, each belonging to separate companies or subsidiaries.

Integrated device manufacturers (IDMs) design and manufacture integrated circuits. Many companies, known as fabless semiconductor companies, only design devices; merchant or pure play foundries only manufacture devices for other companies, without designing them. Examples of IDMs are Intel, Samsung, and Texas Instruments, examples of fabless companies are AMD, Nvidia, and Qualcomm, and examples of pure play foundries are GlobalFoundries, TSMC, and UMC.

Integrated circuit production facilities are expensive to build and maintain. Unless they can be kept at nearly full use, they will become a drain on the finances of the company that owns them. The foundry model uses two methods to avoid these costs: fabless companies avoid costs by not owning such facilities. Merchant foundries, on the other hand, find work from the worldwide pool of fabless companies, and by careful scheduling, pricing, and contracting keep their plants at full use.

History
Originally, microelectronic devices were manufactured by companies that both designed and produced the devices. These manufacturers were involved in both the research and development of manufacturing processes and the research and development of microcircuit design.

The first pure play semiconductor company is the Taiwan Semiconductor Manufacturing Corporation, a spin-off of the government Industrial Technology Research Institute, which split its design and fabrication divisions in 1987, a model advocated for by Carver Mead in the U.S., but deemed too costly to pursue. The separation of design and fabrication became known as the foundry model, with fabless manufacturing outsourcing to semiconductor foundries.

Fabless semiconductor companies do not have any semiconductor fabrication capability; and contract production from a merchant foundry manufacturer. The fabless company concentrates on the research and development of an IC-product; the foundry concentrates on manufacturing and testing the physical product. If the foundry does not have any semiconductor design capability, it is a pure play semiconductor foundry.

An absolute separation into fabless and foundry companies is not necessary. Some companies continue to exist which perform both operations and benefit from the close coupling of their skills. Some companies manufacture some of their own designs and contract out to have others manufactured or designed, in cases where they see value or seek special skills. The foundry model is a business vision that seeks to optimize productivity.

MOSIS
The very first merchant foundries were part of the MOSIS service. The MOSIS service gave limited production-access to designers with limited means, such as students, university researchers, and engineers at small startups. The designer submitted designs and these submissions were manufactured with the commercial company's extra capacity. Manufacturers could insert some wafers for a MOSIS design into a collection of their own wafers when a processing step was compatible with both operations. The commercial company (serving as foundry) was already running the process, so they were effectively being paid by MOSIS for something they were already doing. A factory with excess capacity during slow periods could also run MOSIS designs to avoid having expensive capital equipment standing idle.

Under-use of an expensive manufacturing plant could lead to the financial ruin of the owner, so selling surplus wafer capacity was a way to maximize the fab's use. Hence, economic factors created a climate where fab operators wanted to sell surplus wafer-manufacturing capacity, and designers wanted to purchase manufacturing capacity rather than try to build it.

Although MOSIS opened the doors to some fabless customers, earning additional revenue for the foundry and providing inexpensive service to the customer, running a business around MOSIS production was difficult. The merchant foundries sold wafer capacity on a surplus basis, as a secondary business activity. Services to the customers were secondary to the commercial business, with little guarantee of support. The choice of merchant dictated the design, development flow, and available techniques to the fabless customer. Merchant foundries might require proprietary and non-portable preparation steps. Foundries concerned with protecting what they considered trade secrets of their methodologies might only be willing to release data to designers after an onerous nondisclosure procedure.

Dedicated foundry
In 1987, the world's first dedicated merchant foundry opened its doors: Taiwan Semiconductor Manufacturing Company (TSMC). The distinction of 'dedicated' is in reference to the typical merchant foundry of the era, whose primary business activity was building and selling of its own IC-products. The dedicated foundry offers several key advantages to its customers: first, it does not sell finished IC-products into the supply channel; thus a dedicated foundry will never compete directly with its fabless customers (obviating a common concern of fabless companies). Second, the dedicated foundry can scale production capacity to a customer's needs, offering low-quantity shuttle services in addition to full-scale production lines. Finally, the dedicated foundry offers a "COT-flow" (customer owned tooling) based on industry-standard EDA systems, whereas many IDM merchants required its customers to use proprietary (non-portable) development tools. The COT advantage gave the customer complete control over the design process, from concept to final design.

Foundry sales leaders by year

 Pure-play semiconductor foundry is a company that does not offer a significant amount of IC products of its own design, but instead operates semiconductor fabrication plants focused on producing ICs for other companies.
 Integrated device manufacturer (IDM) semiconductor foundry is where companies such as Texas Instruments, IBM, and Samsung join in to provide foundry services as long as there is no conflict of interest between relevant parties.

2017

2016–2014

2013

2011

2010

2009–2007
As of 2009, the top 17 semiconductor foundries were:

(1) Now acquired by GlobalFoundries

2008–2006
As of 2008, the top 18 pure-play semiconductor foundries were:

(1) Merged with CR Logic in 2008, reclassified as an IDM foundry

2007–2005
As of 2007, the top 14 semiconductor foundries include:

For ranking in worldwide:

2004
As of 2004, the top 10 pure-play semiconductor foundries were:

Financial and IP issues
Like all industries, the semiconductor industry faces upcoming challenges and obstacles.

The cost to stay on the leading edge has steadily increased with each generation of chips. The financial strain is being felt by both large merchant foundries and their fabless customers. The cost of a new foundry exceeds $1 billion. These costs must be passed on to customers. Many merchant foundries have entered into joint ventures with their competitors in an effort to split research and design expenditures and fab-maintenance expenses.

Chip design companies sometimes avoid other companies' patents simply by purchasing the products from a licensed foundry with broad cross-license agreements with the patent owner.

Stolen design data is also a concern; data is rarely directly copied, because blatant copies are easily identified by distinctive features in the chip,
placed there either for this purpose or as a byproduct of the design process. However, the data including any procedure, process system, method of operation or concept may be sold to a competitor, who may save months or years of tedious reverse engineering.

See also

 Fabless manufacturing
 Contract manufacturer
 Integrated device manufacturer
 Semiconductor fabrication
 Original design manufacturer
 Original equipment manufacturer
 Semiconductor fabless sales leaders by year
 Semiconductor equipment sales leaders by year

References

External links
Compound Semiconductor.net: "Foundry model could be key to InP industry future"

 
Semiconductor device fabrication
Semiconductors